The Legend of the Golden Gun is a 1979 American Western television film, starring Jeff Osterhage, Hal Holbrook, Carl Franklin, and Robert Davi.

Plot summary
John Golden, a young farmer whose parents are murdered meets Joshua Brown, a runaway slave, and they team up to track down the legendary Confederate guerrilla William Quantrill. Along their travels, they run into a legendary gunfighter, who teaches the young farmer how to shoot and gives him a special gun that shoots seven rounds, the seventh of which is intended as an advantage against evil.

Cast
 Jeff Osterhage as John Golden
 Carl Franklin as Joshua Brown
 Robert Davi as William Quantrill
 Keir Dullea as General Custer
 Michele Carey as Maggie
 John McLiam as Jake Powell
 Elissa Leeds as Sara Powell
 R. G. Armstrong as Judge Harrison Harding
 Hal Holbrook as J.R. Swackhammer
 William Bryant as William Ford
 Rex Holman as Sturges
 J. Brian Pizer as Captain Marks
 R. L. Tolbert as Buffalo Bill
 Budge Taylor as Dr. Wheller
 Walt Davis as Soldier #3
 Michael Yama as The photographer
 David Holbrook as The young outlaw

DVD
"The Legend of the Golden Gun" was released on DVD on December 4, 2012 and still is available to order at Amazon.com and at tcm.com

References

External links
 

1979 television films
1979 Western (genre) films
American Western (genre) television films
NBC network original films
Films produced by Harve Bennett
American Civil War films
Films directed by Alan J. Levi
1970s American films
1970s English-language films